Alon Halfon (born July 2, 1973) is a former Israeli footballer.

Honours
Israeli Premier League (1):
1998-99
Toto Cup (1):
2000-01
Israeli Second Division (1):
2004-05

References

1973 births
Israeli Jews
Living people
Israeli footballers
Israel international footballers
Maccabi Netanya F.C. players
Hapoel Haifa F.C. players
Hapoel Tel Aviv F.C. players
Hapoel Kfar Saba F.C. players
Liga Leumit players
Israeli Premier League players
Footballers from Netanya
Association football defenders